Raymond Hornberger (December 23, 1898 – May 28, 1976) was an American soccer halfback.  Hornberger earned four caps with the U.S. national team in 1924.  His first two caps came in the 1924 Summer Olympics.  The U.S. won its first game 1-0 against Estonia, but lost to Uruguay in the quarterfinals.  Following its elimination from the tournament, the U.S. played two exhibition games.  The U.S. defeated Poland, then lost to Ireland.  That was Hornberger’s last game with the national team. At some point prior to the Olympics, he played for Disston A.A.  Following the Olympics, he played five games with Fleisher Yarn during the 1924–25 American Soccer League season. He died in Philadelphia, Pennsylvania.

References

1898 births
1976 deaths
United States men's international soccer players
Olympic soccer players of the United States
Footballers at the 1924 Summer Olympics
American Soccer League (1921–1933) players
Fleisher Yarn players
Soccer players from Philadelphia
Association football defenders
American soccer players